The 1946 municipal election was held November 6, 1946 to elect a mayor and six aldermen to sit on Edmonton City Council, four trustees to sit on the public school board, while four trustees were acclaimed to the separate school board.

There were ten aldermen on city council, but four of the positions were already filled: James McCrie Douglas, John Munro, John Gillies, and Charles Gariepy were all elected to two year terms in 1945 and were still in office. Ethel Browne (SS) had also been elected to a two-year term in 1945, but had resigned due to ill health; accordingly, Harold Tanner (SS) was elected to a one-year term.

There were seven trustees on the public school board, but three of the positions were already filled: Mary Butterworth (SS), E S Haynes, and Armour Ford had been elected to two year terms in 1945 and were still in office.  Albert Ottewell (SS) had also been elected to a two-year term in 1945, but had died; accordingly, Andrew Stewart was elected to a one-year term.

On the separate board, there were four vacancies out of seven seats, as Joseph Gallant, Thomas Malone, and Joseph Pilon were continuing.  William Wilde (SS) had been elected to a two-year term in 1945, but had resigned; accordingly, newcomer Weldon Bateman (SS) was acclaimed to a one-year term.

Voter turnout

There were 24,919 ballots cast out of 73,852 eligible voters, for a voter turnout of 33.7%.

Results

 bold or  indicates elected
 italics indicate incumbent
 "SS", where data is available, indicates representative for Edmonton's South Side, with a minimum South Side representation instituted after the city of Strathcona, south of the North Saskatchewan River, amalgamated into Edmonton on February 1, 1912.

Mayor

Aldermen

Public school trustees

Separate (Catholic) school trustees

Adrian Crowe (SS), Francis Killeen, James O'Hara, and Weldon Bateman (SS) were acclaimed.

Daylight Saving Plebiscite

Are you in favour of Daylight Saving Time being put into operation in the City of Edmonton from a date in the month of April to a date in the month in September?
Yes - 13,837
No - 10,471

References

Election History, City of Edmonton: Elections and Census Office

1946
1946 elections in Canada
1946 in Alberta